Ambrogio Landucci, O.S.A. (1596 – 16 February 1669) was a Roman Catholic prelate who served as Titular Bishop of Porphyreon (1655–1669).

Biography
Ambrogio Landucci was born in Siena, Italy and ordained a priest in the Order of Saint Augustine.
On 30 August 1655, he was appointed during the papacy of Pope Alexander VII as Titular Bishop of Porphyreon.
On 12 September 1655, he was consecrated bishop by Giovanni Battista Maria Pallotta, Cardinal-Priest of San Pietro in Vincoli, with Patrizio Donati, Bishop Emeritus of Minori, and Taddeo Altini, Bishop of Civita Castellana e Orte, serving as co-consecrators. 
He served as Titular Bishop of Porphyreon until his death on 16 February 1669.

Episcopal succession
While bishop, he was the principal consecrator of:
Zacharie de Metz, Titular Bishop of Tralles in Asia and Coadjutor Apostolic Vicariate of Batavia (1656);
Giuseppe Maria Sebastiani, Titular Bishop of Hierapolis in Isauria and Vicar Apostolic of Malabar (1659); 
and the principal co-consecrator of:
Henri Borghi, Bishop of Alife (1658).

References

External links and additional sources
 (for Chronology of Bishops) 
 (for Chronology of Bishops)  

17th-century Roman Catholic titular bishops
Bishops appointed by Pope Alexander VII
1596 births
1669 deaths
People from Siena
Augustinian bishops